The New England Manufacturers' and Mechanics' Institute (established in 1879) flourished in the 1880s in Boston, Massachusetts. It existed as a rival to the long-established Massachusetts Charitable Mechanic Association. Individuals affiliated with the NEM and M Institute included businessman John F. Wood, James L. Little, John M. Little, Samuel R. Payson, William B. Merrill, and Frederick W. Griffin.

History

According to the organization's own institutional history, before 1879, "the only industrial exhibitions at Boston were organised under the auspices of an association formed with an ulterior purpose. Nor were these held in permanent structures or with regular intervals. ... At the last exhibition held in a temporary structure -— that of 1878 -— it became evident that a permanent organisation and a building were needed, as over three-fifths of those wishing to exhibit could not be accommodated because of lack of space." In response, the NEM & M Institute incorporated in 1879 "for the purpose of the general improvement of the manufacturing and mechanical interests of New England; to provide means by which worthy and adequate exhibitions of manufactures and other productions can be given, and cognate objects; to obtain and distribute information relative to export business; to create and regulate methods of industrial education; to improve the technical knowledge of the members of the society by libraries, technical lectures and discussions."

New England Fair
The organization built a large exhibition hall in the Back Bay neighborhood (at Huntington Avenue and Rogers Avenue), very close to the MCMA's Mechanics Hall. The New England Fair building "covered an area of nearly five acres of land. Its available floor space for exposition purposes exceeded eight acres." Comparatively, the Mechanics' Hall's footprint measured only 90,000 square feet.

Exhibitions were held annually. In 1881, "Governor Long [opened] the exhibition, and the Hon. George B. Loring, United States commissioner of agriculture, [delivered] an oration. The governors, the U.S. senators and representatives in congress, and the mayors of all the cities of New England" were invited. "During the winter seasons [the New England Fair building] was utilized as a skating rink, and pedestrian, bicycle, and other contests were held there."

In 1885 the exhibition building was sold to the Metropolitan Horse Railroad, for use as "a storage and repair shop." The building burnt to the ground in June 1886, in a massive fire that killed 8 people.

References

Further reading
 Edward Atkinson. Address delivered ... at the opening of the 2d annual fair of the New England manufacturers' & mechanics' institute, in Boston ... 1882. Rand, Avery, & co., 1882. Google books. Excerpt: "We are engaged in a work by which the antagonisms of race and language of the Old World will be overcome. Democracy is the solvent, and the common school is the crystallizing medium. Presently the people of this land will have ingrafted upon the narrow but versatile intellect of the Yankee, the courage and endurance of the Englishman, without his pig-headedness; the cleanliness of the Dutchman, without his stolidity; the thrift of the French peasant, without his superstition; the artistic sense of the Italian, without his treachery; the wit of the Irishman, without his incapacity to trust his neighbor; the philosophy of the German, without his scepticism; the acquisitiveness of the Jew, without his selfishness; the manual dexterity of the Chinaman, without his idolatry; and the fun and music of the Negro, without his shiftlessness."
 Catalogue of the art department of the New England Manufacturers' and Mechanics' Institute ... Boston, Mass., U.S.A., 1883. Cupples, Upham & Co., 1883. Google books
 Art year book, 1884. New England Institute, 1884. Google books
 Lives lost at a fire; eight bodies taken from the ruins in Boston; destruction of the New England Manufacturers' and Mechanics' Institute building—Loss $400,000. New York Times, June 22, 1886

External links
 Google news archive. Articles about the Institute

Organizations established in 1879
19th century in Boston
Organizations based in Boston
1880s in the United States
Cultural infrastructure completed in 1881
Back Bay, Boston
Burned buildings and structures in the United States
1879 establishments in Massachusetts